
Gmina Zblewo is a rural gmina (administrative district) in Starogard County, Pomeranian Voivodeship, in northern Poland.

Villages
Gmina Zblewo contains the villages and settlements of Babie Doły, Białachówko, Białachowo, Biały Bukowiec, Borzechowo, Bytonia, Jezierce, Jeziornik, Karolewo, Kleszczewo Kościerskie, Królewski Bukowiec, Lipia Góra Mała, Lisewko, Mały Bukowiec, Miradowo, Nowy Cis, Pałubinek, Pazda, Piesienica, Pinczyn, Radziejewo, Semlin, Semlinek, Stary Cis, Tomaszewo, Trosowo, Twardy Dół, Wałdówko, Wirty, Zawada and Zblewo.

Neighbouring gminas
Gmina Zblewo is bordered by the gminas of Kaliska, Lubichowo, Skarszewy, Stara Kiszewa and Starogard Gdański.

References
Polish official population figures 2006

Zblewo
Starogard County